Ville d'Anaunia is a comune (municipality) in the Province of Trentino in the Italian region Trentino-Alto Adige/Südtirol.

It was established on 1 January 2016 by the merger of the municipalities of Nanno, Tassullo and Tuenno.

References

Cities and towns in Trentino-Alto Adige/Südtirol